Heidemarie Grécká-Bártová (born March 13, 1965, in Ústí nad Labem) is a retired female diver from the Czech Republic, who twice competed for Czechoslovakia at the Summer Olympics: 1980 and 1992. She won the bronze medal at the 1991 World Aquatics Championships in the inaugural women's 1 m springboard event.

References 

1965 births
Living people
Czech female divers
Olympic divers of Czechoslovakia
Divers at the 1980 Summer Olympics
Divers at the 1992 Summer Olympics
World Aquatics Championships medalists in diving
Sportspeople from Ústí nad Labem